The Playmaker is a novel based in Australia written by the Australian author Thomas Keneally.

In 1789 in Sydney Cove, the remotest penal colony of the British Empire, a group of convicts and one of their captors unite to stage a play. Governor Arthur Phillip presides over the colony, where 1st Lt. Ralph Clark, sadistic Major Robert Ross (Royal Marines officer), and Midshipman Harry Brewer have a curious effect on the goings-on of the new Australian colony. As felons, perjurers, thieves, and whores rehearse, their playmaker, Ralph Clark, is derided by authority. He also becomes strangely seduced. For the play's power is mirrored in the rich, varied life of this primitive land, and, not least, in the convict and actress Mary Brenham.

The play that they plan to stage is The Recruiting Officer, a 1706 play by the Irish writer George Farquhar, which follows the social and sexual exploits of two officers, the womanising Plume and the cowardly Brazen, in the town of Shrewsbury to recruit soldiers. Many arguments are made over naturalism vs. presentationalism in acting style, and in the merits of the theatre itself.

The novel has successfully been rewritten into a play in 1988 by British playwright Timberlake Wertenbaker, called Our Country's Good.

Dedication
"To Arabanoo and his brethren, still dispossessed."

Novels by Thomas Keneally
1987 Australian novels
Fiction set in 1789
Novels set in Sydney
Hodder & Stoughton books
Novels set in the 1780s
Australian novels adapted into plays